Machynlleth is a market town, community and electoral ward in Powys, Wales and within the historic boundaries of Montgomeryshire. It is in the Dyfi Valley at the intersection of the A487 and the A489 roads.  At the 2001 Census it had a population of 2,147, rising to 2,235 in 2011. It is sometimes referred to colloquially as Mach.

Machynlleth was the seat of Owain Glyndŵr's Welsh Parliament in 1404, and as such claims to be the "ancient capital of Wales". However, it has never held any official recognition as a capital. It applied for city status in 2000 and 2002, but was unsuccessful. It is twinned with Belleville, Michigan.

Machynlleth hosted the National Eisteddfod in 1937 and 1981.

Etymology 
The etymology of the name Machynlleth derives from "ma-" [field, plain] and "Cynllaith".

History 
There is a long history of human activity in the Machynlleth area. In the late-1990s, radiocarbon dating showed that copper mining was taking place in the Early Bronze Age ( 2,750 years ago), within  of the town centre.

One of the earliest written references to Machynlleth is the Royal charter granted in 1291 by Edward I to Owen de la Pole, Lord of Powys. This gave him the right to hold "a market at Machynlleth every Wednesday for ever and two fairs every year". The Wednesday market is still a busy and popular day in Machynlleth 700 years later.

According to local tradition, Dafydd Gam, a Welsh ally of the English kings, was imprisoned here from 1404 to 1412 for attempting to assassinate Owain Glyndŵr. After his release by Glyndŵr, ransomed Gam fought alongside Henry V at the Battle of Agincourt and is named amongst the dead in Shakespeare's Henry V. The name Royal House undoubtedly refers to the tradition that Charles I stayed at the house in 1643.

The weekly market and biannual fair thrived, and in 1613 drew complaints from other towns whose trading in cloth was being severely affected. A document dated 1632 shows that animals for sale came from all over Merionethshire, Montgomeryshire, Cardiganshire, Carmarthenshire and Denbighshire, and prospective buyers came from Flintshire, Radnorshire, Brecknockshire, Herefordshire and Shropshire, in addition to the above.

The Dyfi Bridge was first mentioned in 1533, by Geoffrey Hughes, "Citizen and Merchant taylour of London" who left  "towards making of a bridge at the toune of Mathanlleth". By 1601 "Dovey bridge in the Hundred of Mochunleth" was reported to be insufficient, and the current one was built in 1805 for £250. Fenton describes it in 1809 as "A noble erection of five large arches. The piers are narrow and over each cut-water is a pilaster, a common feature of the 18th century".

Rowland Pugh was the Lord of Meirionedd, and lived at Mathafarn about two miles east of Machynlleth. Pugh supported the Royalist side in the English Civil War. On 2 November 1644, Sir Thomas Myddleton of Chirk Castle was marching on Machynlleth with a force of the Parliamentarian army, when he was ambushed by a force organised by Pugh. In retaliation for the attack, Myddleton burned down Mathafarn on 29 November 1644, along with a number of houses in Machynlleth.

Laura Ashley's first shop was opened in Machynlleth (at 35 Maengwyn Street) in 1961.

The disappearance of April Jones in October 2012 received a large amount of coverage in the UK media.

, the Londonderry family and the Clock Tower 

He became Earl Vane on the death of his father and the fifth Marquess on the death of his half-brother.

To celebrate the 21st birthday of their eldest son, Viscount Castlereagh, the townspeople subscribed to the erection (at the town's main road intersection) of the clock tower, which has become widely known as the symbol of Machynlleth. The tower, which stands on the site of the old town hall, is the first thing many visitors will notice. The foundation stone was laid on 15 July 1874 amid great festivities.

Another son, Lord Herbert Vane-Tempest, was the last member of the family to live at the Plas and was killed in the Abermule train collision on the Cambrian Railways, of which he was a director.

The house was given to the townspeople in December 1948 under the stewardship of the then Machynlleth Urban District Council.

Celtica
Various local government re-organisations saw responsibility for the Plas pass first to Montgomeryshire District Council, who in 1995 converted it into the Celtica visitor centre. Celtica interpreted the history and culture of the Celts with a walk-through audio-visual exhibition housed in a purpose-built addition to the house. The £3 million attraction was part-funded by the European Union. The centre had a high-profile in the Welsh media, with opera singer Bryn Terfel officially opening the attraction in October 1995.

Powys County Council took over Celtica and the house when it was formed as a unitary authority in 1997. The centre was successful in attracting tourist, school groups and conferences for a number of years, however initial visitor number predictions proved to be too ambitious and the council was unwilling to prolong its subsidy and with little scope for alternative investment Celtica closed in March 2006, and the house stood empty while Powys County Council sought to relinquish responsibility for it in line with their policy of selling many of their publicly owned buildings.

At this point, Machynlleth Town Council, realising that the town was in danger of losing the Plas house and grounds, which they saw as belonging to the community in the spirit of the 1948 bequest, began discussions with Powys Council with a view to the Town Council taking ownership of the Plas. On 1 April 2008, in a move thought to be unprecedented for a community council of its size, Machynlleth Town Council took ownership of the Plas and its parkland and facilities. It has reopened the restaurant by leasing it to a local licensee and the 1st and 2nd floors of the main building are rented out as office space. Medium-sized meeting rooms and conference space are also offered for hire.

Transport links 
From 1859 to 1948 the town was served by the narrow gauge Corris Railway, which brought slate from the quarries around Corris and Aberllefenni for onward despatch to the markets. The railway's Machynlleth station building, built in 1905, can still be seen alongside the road approaching the town from the north.

Machynlleth main-line station was built by the Newtown and Machynlleth Railway, and continues to provide a link to Aberystwyth and the Cambrian coast to the west and Newtown and Shrewsbury to the east. Services were operated by Arriva Trains Wales and subsequently are operated by Transport for Wales.

Machynlleth is served by two TrawsCymru long-distance bus routes. The T2 connects the town with Bangor to the north and continues to Aberystwyth (where connections can be made to South Wales). There is also the T12 which runs to Wrexham via Newtown - this is branded as TrawsCymru Connect.

Machynlleth is home to the signalling centre that controls the European Rail Traffic Management System (ERTMS) on the Cambrian Line. The system went into full operational use in March 2011.

Welsh language 
Machynlleth retains its linguistic tradition, with Welsh spoken alongside English. The 2011 Census indicated that 67% of the population have some knowledge of Welsh, with 39% able to read, write and speak the language.

Owain Glyndŵr 

Machynlleth has a special role in Welsh history because of its connection with Owain Glyndŵr, a Prince of Wales who rebelled against the English during the reign of King Henry IV. Owain was crowned Prince of Wales in 1404 near the Parliament House, which is one of three mediaeval houses in town, in the presence of leaders from Scotland, France and Spain, and he held his own Parliament in the town. He held his last parliament in the nearby village of Pennal, by the Church of St Peter ad Vincula. It is thought that after the rebellion floundered, Owain went into hiding in the area around Machynlleth.

Tourism 
Tourism is the primary employment sector with a range of activity based attractions (for example several mountain biking trails) as well as the visitor centre at the Centre for Alternative Technology. Agriculture continues to play a significant part in the make-up of the town and surrounding area. Another important local industry and employer is the renewable energy sector. The area has a renewable energy industry with several small to medium-sized companies operating in or around the town.

The town has a market on Wednesdays which includes traditional Welsh, Spanish and French food stalls.

The town has hosted the Machynlleth Comedy Festival annually since May 2010, featuring comedians such as Jon Richardson, Pappy's, Josie Long, Stewart Lee and Richard Herring. The festival dominates the town for a weekend, with events running over three days in nine venues.

Machynlleth lies on Glyndŵr's Way and the Dyfi Valley Way, two long-distance footpaths.

MoMA Wales
Machynlleth is the home of the Museum of Modern Art (MoMA), Wales. It originated in 1986 as Y Tabernacl, a centre of performing arts in an old chapel, a private initiative by former journalist Andrew Lambert. In 1994 this was expanded with a new complex of art galleries, a recording studio and a language laboratory. Lambert had previously tried to convert the town's old railway station into a hotel and museum, employing international architect Richard Rogers.

MoMA Wales hosts the annual Machynlleth Festival, as well as its own annual open exhibition of art.

Environment
Machynlleth is the home of Ecodyfi, a locally controlled organisation that was set up to foster and support a greener community and economy in the Dyfi Valley.

The Centre for Alternative Technology is based in a disused quarry three miles from Machynlleth.

In December 2019 Machynlleth council was the first in Wales to declare a climate emergency.

Governance
Machynlleth has a town council, elected from the ward, with fourteen councillors.

The ward elects a county councillor to Powys County Council, though the current county councillor, Michael Williams, was unopposed again at the May 2017 election. He had been elected unopposed since first winning the seat in 1980. He had also sat on the Machynlleth Town Council since 1974.

In 2019, the town council became the first in Wales to formally support Welsh independence.

Sport 
Machynlleth Town Football Club, founded in 1885, plays in the Spar Mid-Wales district league and the reserve team is in the Cambrian Tyres Division 2 Amateur football league. The Machynlleth Rugby Club plays in the North Wales Division 2.

Notable people 
 Owain Glyndŵr, ( 1349 or 1359 –  1416), Welsh ruler and Prince of Wales, crowned locally in 1404.
 Hywel Swrdwal, ( 1430–1475), Welsh language poet 
 David Griffiths, (1792–1863), missionary and Bible translator in Madagascar, lived locally from 1858
 Henry Rogers, (1806–1877), nonconformist minister and man of letters, died locally.
 Thomas Wickham (1810-1890), English cricketer, died locally
 John Evans (1816–1879), miner and political figure in British Columbia, born and educated locally
 George Vane-Tempest, 5th Marquess of Londonderry, (1821–1884), aristocrat, businessman, diplomat and politician, lived at Plas Machynlleth
 Charles Vane-Tempest-Stewart, 6th Marquess of Londonderry, (1852–1915), politician, landowner and benefactor, lived at Plas Machynlleth
 Herbert Lionel Henry Vane-Tempest (1862–1921), director of Cambrian Railways, lived at Plas Machynlleth, died at the Abermule train collision.
 James Atkin, Baron Atkin (1867–1944), lawyer and judge, local JP
 Edward M. Lewis, (1872–1936), professor of English literature in the US & baseball player 
 Berta Ruck  (1878–1978), Welsh writer who grew up nearby.
 Thomas Williams Phillips, (1883–1966), senior Civil Servant, educated at Machynlleth County School
 William David Davies, (1897–1969), Presbyterian minister and writer on theology, lived locally
 Sir John Philip Baxter KBE CMG FAA (1905–1989), chemical engineer.
 Syd Thomas (1919–2012) a Welsh professional footballer winger.
 Laura Ashley (1925–1985), opened her first shop locally at 35 Maengwyn Street in 1961
 Emrys James, (1928–1989), Welsh Shakespearean actor
 Geraint Lloyd Owen (born 1941), Welsh-language poet and teacher, taught locally
 Meri Wells (born 1946), ceramic sculptor, lives and works nearby
 Gareth Glyn, (born 1951), Welsh composer and radio broadcaster
 David Russell Hulme, (born 1951), Welsh conductor and musicologist
 Annie Morgan Suganami (born 1952), Welsh artist and musician, lives and works locally
 Gwynn ap Gwilym, (1955–2016), Welsh language poet, novelist, editor and translator, raised locally
 George Monbiot, (born 1963), English writer, lived locally for a number of years and still has a house and family there
 Led Zeppelin (formed in London in 1968), rock band members Jimmy Page and Robert Plant commenced writing the album Led Zeppelin III at nearby Bron-Yr-Aur cottage
 Nicky Arscott (born 1983), local artist and arts educator
 April Jones (2007–2012), child murder victim

References

External links 

 
 2001 Census Neighbourhood Statistics: Machynlleth
 Photos of Machynlleth and surrounding area on Geograph
 The Eco Dyfi website

 
Towns in Powys
Communities in Powys
Wards of Powys